Jamishlu (also Romanized as Jamīshlū and Jamīshloo; also known as Jāmeshlū and Jāmshlū) is a village in Razan Rural District, in the Central District of Razan County, Hamadan Province, Iran. At the 2006 census, its population was 999, in 250 families.
Ghorbanali Namdari, one of famous poets of Iran, is from this village. The people of this village speak Azeri Turkish.

References 

Populated places in Razan County